Kasani Gnaneshwar Mudiraj (born 19 August 1954) is an Indian politician, who served as Member of Legislative Council, representing the Indian state Andhra Pradesh from 2007 to 2011. He was appointed as the State President of Telugu Desam Party for the Telangana unit by former chief minister N. Chandrababu Naidu in November 2022.

Kasani Gnaneshwar also serves as the National President of Mudiraj Mahasabha and is often considered a strong leader of the BC community. He was the president of Mana Party, which was founded by him in 2007.

Career 
He served as chairman of Ranga Reddy Zila Parishad representing Telugu Desam Party from 2001 to 2006.

In 2007, Gnaneshwar was elected to Andhra Pradesh Legislative Council from the Assembly quota as an independent supported by ten Telangana Rashtra Samithi rebel MLAs.

He resigned from Telugu Desam Party (TDP), following differences with another party leader Tulla Devender Goud. In August 2007, he launched his own political party, named Mana Party, which claims to be representative of over 90 BC castes in Andhra Pradesh.

In 2009, he unsuccessfully contested the assembly election from Quthbullapur constituency, gained 23430 votes for Mana Party. Later, he entered into an alliance with Chiranjeevi's Praja Rajyam Party and contested 2009 general election from Chevella (Lok Sabha constituency), received 19996 votes. He is Prajakutami candidate in 2018 Telangana Legislative Assembly election, contesting on the Indian National Congress ticket from Secunderabad (Assembly constituency) and lost the election.

In 2022, he again joined back into the Telugu Desam Party in the presence of the party president and former Chief Minister of Andhra Pradesh, N. Chandrababu Naidu.
On November 4, 2022, Kasani was appointed as the President of the Telugu Desam Party (TDP), Telangana unit. He took charge as the president of Telugu Desam Party, Telangana on November 10, 2022.

Positions held

Other 
He also served as president of Hyderabad Cricket Association and Telangana Kabaddi Association. In April 2017, he was elected as treasurer of All Indian Amateur Kabaddi Federation (AKF). He is serving as the director of International Kabaddi Federation since 2015.

See also 
 Andhra Pradesh Legislative Council
 List of people from Telangana
 Mana Party (India)

References

Living people
Members of the Andhra Pradesh Legislative Council
Indian National Congress politicians from Andhra Pradesh
People from Telangana
Andhra Pradesh politicians
1954 births